The 2000 Rushmoor Council election took place on 4 May 2000 to elect members of Rushmoor Borough Council in Hampshire, England. One third of the council was up for election and the Conservative Party gained overall control of the council from no overall control.

The election took place at the same time as a referendum on whether to change the name of the borough council from Rushmoor to either Aldershot and Farnborough, or Farnborough and Aldershot. The change of name was rejected with 13,891 votes against to only 2,747 in favour on a turnout of 29%.

After the election, the composition of the council was
Conservative 24
Liberal Democrat 10
Labour 10
Independent 1

Election result

Ward results

References

2000
2000 English local elections
2000s in Hampshire